Kapadvanj was a Lok Sabha parliamentary constituency in Gujarat in Kheda district. It was abolished in 2009.

After the reorganisation of Lok Sabha constituencies in 2008, Kapadvanj seat ceased to exist and most/all of its area became part of the new Panchmahal Lok Sabha seat.

Members of Parliament
1952: Maniben Vallabhbhai Patel, INC ( as Khira South Seat )
1952: F. R. D. Thakor, MJP ( as Khira North Seat )
1957: F. R. D. Thakor, MJP ( as Khira Seat )
1962: Pravinsinh Solanki, Indian National Congress ( as Khira Seat )
1967: Pravinsinh Solanki, Indian National Congress ( as Khira Seat )
1971: Dharamsinh Dadubhai Desai, Indian National Congress ( as Khira Seat )
1977: Dharamsinh Dadubhai Desai, Indian National Congress ( as Khira Seat )
1977: Shankersinh Vaghela, Janata Party
1980: Natwarsinh Solanki, Indian National Congress (Indira)
1984: Natwarsinh Solanki, Indian National Congress
1989: Gabhaji Mangaji Thakor, Bharatiya Janata Party
1991: Gabhaji Mangaji Thakor, Bharatiya Janata Party
1996: Jaysinhji Chauhan, Bharatiya Janata Party
1998: Jaysinhji Chauhan, Bharatiya Janata Party
1999: Shankersinh Vaghela, Indian National Congress
2004: Shankarsinh Vaghela, Indian National Congress

See also
 Kapadvanj
 Godhra Lok Sabha constituency
 Panchmahal Lok Sabha constituency
 List of Constituencies of the Lok Sabha

References

Kheda district
Former Lok Sabha constituencies of Gujarat
Former constituencies of the Lok Sabha
2008 disestablishments in India
Constituencies disestablished in 2008